Abdul Mannan (19 December 1953 – 18 January 2020) was a Bangladesh Awami League politician and a Jatiya Sangsad member representing the Bogra-1 constituency.

Early life and career
Mannan was born on 19 December 1953. He completed his master's degree in agriculture science.

Mannan was elected to Parliament in 2008 and re-elected on 5 January 2014 from Bogra-1 as a Bangladesh Awami League candidate. He was the Bangladesh Awami League central Organising Secretary. In September 2013, he and his wife were injured in a road accident. He was also elected from this constituency in 2018.

Death
Mannan died of cardiac arrest on 18 January 2020.

References

1953 births
2020 deaths
Awami League politicians
9th Jatiya Sangsad members
10th Jatiya Sangsad members
11th Jatiya Sangsad members
Place of birth missing